The Society for Judgment and Decision Making is an interdisciplinary academic organization dedicated to the study of normative, descriptive, and prescriptive theories of decision. Its members include psychologists, economists, organizational and marketing researchers, decision analysts, and other decision researchers. The society's primary event is its annual meeting at which society members present their research. It also publishes the journal Judgment and Decision Making. The current president of the society is Rick Larrick.

Membership
The society has about 1,500 members.  Although meetings have always been in North America, the membership is international.  The president and some of the executive board are chosen by approval voting.

History
The society was founded in 1980 by James Shanteau, Charles Gettys, and others, as a way of bringing together researchers who study human judgments and decisions from different perspectives.

Past presidents include:

Conference
The annual conference has been held every year in conjunction with the meeting of the Psychonomic Society, now overlapping by two days, in mid-November.  More than 700 people attended the conference in 2015 and in 2016. The NSJD annual meeting for 2022 is scheduled to occur in  San Diego.

Publications and journal
The society has published a book series, first in cooperation with Cambridge University Press and now in cooperation with Lawrence Erlbaum Associates. It also publishes an open-access on-line journal called Judgment and Decision Making, as of July 2007.

References

External links
 Judgment and Decision Making, the online journal
 SJDM official home page

Psychology organizations based in the United States
Organizations established in 1980